Serine/threonine-protein kinase D1 is an enzyme that in humans is encoded by the PRKD1 gene.

Function 

Members of the protein kinase D (PKD) family function in many extracellular receptor-mediated signal transduction pathways. The PRKCM gene encodes a cytosolic serine-threonine kinase that binds to the trans-Golgi network and regulates the fission of transport carriers specifically destined to the cell surface.[supplied by OMIM]

Interactions 

Protein kinase D1 has been shown to interact with:

 Bruton's tyrosine kinase,
 C1QBP, 
 Centaurin, alpha 1, 
 Metallothionein 2A,  and
 YWHAQ.

References

Further reading 

 
 
 
 
 
 
 
 
 
 
 
 
 
 
 
 
 
 
 

EC 2.7.11